Visakhapatnam Metropolitan Region is the metropolitan area covered by the city of Visakhapatnam in the Indian state of Andhra Pradesh. The entire region is spread over the districts of Visakhapatnam,Vizianagaram and Anakapalli.

History 
Prior to VUDA, the Town Planning Trust had existed since 1962 that implemented developmental activities in and around Visakhapatnam. The TPT was upgraded and Visakhapatnam Urban Development Authority was constituted in 1978 with its jurisdiction extending over Visakhapatnam Municipal Corporation and four municipal towns namely Vizianagaram, Bheemunipatnam, Gajuwaka and Anakapalli, comprising an area of 1,721 sq km.

Spread over four districts including Srikakulam, Vizianagaram, Visakhapatnam and East Godavari. On 13 February 2019, the Government of Andhra Pradesh constituted Srikakulam Urban Development Authority. So, the VMRDA loses  of Srikakulam district to new urban development body.

On 23 February 2021, VMRDA has taken the remaining 13 non-Agency mandals under its jurisdiction, taking its total to 52 mandals. This decision comes in light of the rapid urbanisation towards the western corridors of Visakhapatnam city. As per sources, this inclusion of mandals is expected to reduce pressure on the urban infrastructure of the city, ensuring planned development in the fringe areas.

Jurisdiction 
Under the jurisdiction of VMRDA, the Visakhapatnam Metropolitan Region (VMR), comprises, Visakhapatnam city and the districts Vizianagaram and Visakhapatnam.

The below table list the urban areas of VMR:

The below table lists the mandals of VMR:

See also 
List of metropolitan areas in India

References 

Metropolitan areas of India
Geography of Andhra Pradesh